Octaviano Ambrosio Larrazolo (December 7, 1859April 7, 1930) was a Republican politician who served as the fourth governor of New Mexico and a United States senator.  He was the first Mexican-American and first Latino United States senator.

Early life
Larrazolo was born in Valle de Allende in Chihuahua, Mexico, on December 7, 1859, to Don Octaviano, a wealthy landowner, and Doña Donaciana Corral de Larrazolo. He was brought up in a wealthy home and was taught to read and write in his home; he later briefly attended school in his town but left after his schoolteacher beat him. In 1863, French soldiers ransacked the Larrazolo home because the family supported Benito Juarez's revolt against the French.

In 1870 at the age of eleven, Larrazolo left Mexico for Tucson, Arizona Territory, under the care of Jean Salpointe, a French-born bishop of Arizona. Larrazolo left with the bishop because he intended to study theology to become a priest and because his family had fallen into bankruptcy and could not support his schooling. After completing his primary studies with the bishop, Larrazolo studied theology at the St. Michael's College at Santa Fe, New Mexico Territory, graduating in 1876 at the age of 18. He considered entering the priesthood right after his graduation but secured a teaching position instead; he later also taught in El Paso County, Texas. During this time, he started studying law; he taught in the day and studied law at night. On December 11, 1884, Larrazolo became a U.S. citizen in order to prepare himself to become a lawyer. In this same year, he registered with the Texas State Republican Party.

Larrazolo was admitted to the Texas state bar in 1888. He was elected district attorney for the Western District of Texas in 1890 and reelected in 1892. He held the position until 1894.

Larrazolo moved to Las Vegas, New Mexico Territory, in 1895. He practiced law in that town and became involved in Democratic politics and focused on civil rights for the Mexicans and Hispanos who comprised two-thirds of New Mexico's population. Larrazolo had difficulty finding success as a Democrat because most Latinos identified as Republicans. This difficulty is shown by the fact that he narrowly lost elections to become Territorial Delegate to the U.S. Congress in 1900, 1906 and 1908, though the 1908 election was extremely close and subject to several credible fraud charges.

In 1910, Larrazolo attacked the machine politics in New Mexico that he felt were exploiting Hispanic voters across the state. He feared New Mexico was close to becoming like the South where Jim Crow laws stripped African Americans of their rights. This speech is considered a milestone; he forced both Republicans and Democrats to acknowledge the concerns of Hispanics in New Mexico and became the most vocal leader in his generation. In the speech, he said "you [Hispanics] … have allowed yourselves to be controlled by other men but you will be controlled by bosses only as long as you permit the yoke to rest on you...Every native citizen must unite in supporting this constitution because it secures to you people of New Mexico your rights—every one of them; the rights also of your children and in such a manner that they can never be taken away...if you want to acquire your freedom and transmit this sacred heritage in the land hallowed by the blood of your forefathers who fought to protect it...Do not wait until you are put in the position of Arizona which in two years will be able to disfranchise every Spanish speaking citizen."

In 1911, the New Mexican Territory held a constitutional convention in preparation for its entering the Union. Larrazolo was one of the Latino delegates chosen to attend the convention. To his displeasure, the State Convention of the Democratic Party denied his request that half of all statewide nominees be Hispanic to represent the 60 percent of the population of New Mexico that was Hispanic. Despite this, Larrazolo was able to have considerable success in implementing pro-Latino measures in the New Mexico Constitution. He and other people insisted that the Spanish-speaking population of New Mexico be protected by the new state constitution. The reason for this was that Larrazolo did not want the rights of the Spanish-speaking people to be stripped when New Mexico entered the Union because he was afraid that the Union's segregation policies applied to African Americans would be used to justify the infringement of Latinos' rights in New Mexico once it entered the Union.

Larrazolo and the other Latino delegates succeeded in implementing pro-Latino measures and language into the New Mexico State Constitution. The new Bill of Rights stated that (Article II Section V) "The rights, privileges and immunities, civil, political and religious, guaranteed to the people of New Mexico by the Treaty of Guadalupe Hidalgo shall be preserved inviolate." The Education Article, (XII., Section 8), gave the legislature authority to provide training for teachers in public schools so that "they may become proficient in both the English and Spanish languages, to qualify them to teach Spanish-speaking pupils. . .". Section ten of the article assured the right of children of Spanish descent to attend public education institutions and prohibited the establishment of separate schools. To the dismay of Larrazolo, the state Democrats unsuccessfully tried to prevent the ratification of the state constitution because of these pro-Latino provisions, and because of this he became a Republican and remained one for the rest of his life.

Because Larrazolo advocated so strongly for Latino rights, many New Mexico politicians considered him a race agitator. Even though many New Mexico politicians resented him for this, Larrazolo still managed to gain a lot of political credibility especially from Latinos who were glad for the work he had done for Latinos. His popularity throughout New Mexico caused the New Mexico Republican party to nominate him for governor of New Mexico. The campaign in 1918, though, was an intense one that exposed some factions within the Hispanic community. His Democratic opponent, Félix García, claimed that Larrazolo's birth in Chihuahua precluded him from understanding the concerns of "native New Mexicans." He was elected Governor of the State of New Mexico in 1918, becoming the first Mexican-born Latino to be governor of New Mexico. Larrazolo's narrow victory, however, seemed to quiet most of the debate about whether he could authentically advocate on behalf of the Spanish-speaking population. Throughout his time as governor, he had various controversies and successes. In the first year of his term, he declared martial law in the state to suppress a coal mining strike. In the time the fear of anarchism was rampant and this plus the gravity of the strike convinced Larrazolo to declare martial law. He was also criticized for pardoning Mexican troops who raided parts of New Mexico with Pancho Villa. He believed that since the Mexican troops were acting under orders from their superior that they should not be held accountable. He also supported and signed a new income tax law that angered his Republican party. The aspects that he won praise for was his support for the creation of the League of Nations. Larrazolo advocated for bilingual education and supported the civil rights of Mexican immigrants in the state. He was also a supporter of the women's suffrage amendment to the United States Constitution.

Since he angered the Republican party of his state many times throughout his time as governor, the New Mexico Republican Party did not renominate Larrazolo to be governor of New Mexico. This caused him to briefly return to El Paso County, Texas to practice law. He opened a firm in El Paso with Nick Meyer and practiced in New Mexico and Mexico. In 1922 Larrazolo opened an office in Albuquerque as well. However, he did not stay out of politics for too long. In 1923, the state legislature of New Mexico nominated him to become governor of Puerto Rico. He lost this bid but he used the jolt of political popularity that he received by his consideration to be appointed governor of Puerto Rico to reenter politics in New Mexico. He ran and lost an election to become a justice of the New Mexico supreme court in 1924. However, he was elected in 1927 to the New Mexico State House of Representatives. But then in 1927, the Democratic U.S. Senator from New Mexico Andrieus Jones died and Larrazolo ran and on 6 November 1928 won for Jones's remaining term. This made Larrazolo the first Mexican-American to serve in the U.S. Senate. Unfortunately, he was by that time very old and suffered with many illnesses. Because of this he only was able to make it to one session of Congress and he was only able to introduce one legislative action. This action called for the establishment of an industrial school in New Mexico for the Spanish-speaking youth to promote equal opportunity. Larrazolo died on April 7, 1930.

Politics
Larrazolo was admitted to the Texas state bar in 1888. He was elected district attorney for the Western District of Texas in 1890 and reelected in 1892. He held the position until 1894.

Larrazolo moved to Las Vegas, New Mexico Territory, in 1895. He practiced law in that town and became involved in Democratic politics and focused on civil rights for the Mexicans and Hispanos who comprised two-thirds of New Mexico's population. Larrazolo had difficulty finding success as a Democrat because most Latinos identified as Republicans. This difficulty is shown by the fact that he narrowly lost elections to become Territorial Delegate to the U.S. Congress in 1900, 1906 and 1908, though the 1908 election was extremely close and subject to several credible fraud charges.

In 1910, Larrazolo attacked the machine politics in New Mexico that he felt were exploiting Hispanic voters across the state. He feared New Mexico was close to becoming like the South where Jim Crow laws stripped African Americans of their rights. This speech is considered a milestone; he forced both Republicans and Democrats to acknowledge the concerns of Hispanics in New Mexico and became the most vocal leader in his generation. In the speech, he said "you [Hispanics] … have allowed yourselves to be controlled by other men but you will be controlled by bosses only as long as you permit the yoke to rest on you...Every native citizen must unite in supporting this constitution because it secures to you people of New Mexico your rights—every one of them; the rights also of your children and in such a manner that they can never be taken away...if you want to acquire your freedom and transmit this sacred heritage in the land hallowed by the blood of your forefathers who fought to protect it...Do not wait until you are put in the position of Arizona which in two years will be able to disfranchise every Spanish speaking citizen."

In 1911, the New Mexican Territory held a constitutional convention in preparation for its entering the Union. Larrazolo was one of the Latino delegates chosen to attend the convention. To his displeasure, the State Convention of the Democratic Party denied his request that half of all statewide nominees be Hispanic to represent the 60 percent of the population of New Mexico that was Hispanic. Despite this, Larrazolo was able to have considerable success in implementing pro-Latino measures in the New Mexico Constitution. He and other people insisted that the Spanish-speaking population of New Mexico be protected by the new state constitution. The reason for this was that Larrazolo did not want the rights of the Spanish-speaking people to be stripped when New Mexico entered the Union because he was afraid that the Union's segregation policies applied to African Americans would be used to justify the infringement of Latinos' rights in New Mexico once it entered the Union.

Larrazolo and the other Latino delegates succeeded in implementing pro-Latino measures and language into the New Mexico State Constitution. The new Bill of Rights stated that (Article II Section V) "The rights, privileges and immunities, civil, political and religious, guaranteed to the people of New Mexico by the Treaty of Guadalupe Hidalgo shall be preserved inviolate."  The Education Article, (XII., Section 8), gave the legislature authority to provide training for teachers in public schools so that "they may become proficient in both the English and Spanish languages, to qualify them to teach Spanish-speaking pupils. . .". Section ten of the article assured the right of children of Spanish descent to attend public education institutions and prohibited the establishment of separate schools. To the dismay of Larrazolo, the state Democrats unsuccessfully tried to prevent the ratification of the state constitution because of these pro-Latino provisions, and because of this he became a Republican and remained one for the rest of his life.

Because Larrazolo advocated so strongly for Latino rights, many New Mexico politicians considered him a race agitator. Even though many New Mexico politicians resented him for this, Larrazolo still managed to gain a lot of political credibility especially from Latinos who were glad for the work he had done for Latinos. His popularity throughout New Mexico caused the New Mexico Republican party to nominate him for governor of New Mexico. The campaign in 1918, though, was an intense one that exposed some factions within the Hispanic community.  His Democratic opponent, Félix García, claimed that Larrazolo's birth in Chihuahua precluded him from understanding the concerns of "native New Mexicans." He was elected Governor of the State of New Mexico in 1918, becoming the first Mexican-born Latino to be governor of New Mexico. Larrazolo's narrow victory, however, seemed to quiet most of the debate about whether he could authentically advocate on behalf of the Spanish-speaking population. Throughout his time as governor, he had various controversies and successes. In the first year of his term, he declared martial law in the state to suppress a coal mining strike. In the time the fear of anarchism was rampant and this plus the gravity of the strike convinced Larrazolo to declare martial law. He was also criticized for pardoning Mexican troops who raided parts of New Mexico with Pancho Villa. He believed that since the Mexican troops were acting under orders from their superior that they should not be held accountable. He also supported and signed a new income tax law that angered his Republican party. The aspects that he won praise for was his support for the creation of the League of Nations. Larrazolo advocated for bilingual education and supported the civil rights of Mexican immigrants in the state. He was also a supporter of the women's suffrage amendment to the United States Constitution.

Since he angered the Republican party of his state many times throughout his time as governor, the New Mexico Republican Party did not renominate Larrazolo to be governor of New Mexico. This caused him to briefly return to El Paso County, Texas to practice law. He opened a firm in El Paso with Nick Meyer and practiced in New Mexico and Mexico. In 1922 Larrazolo opened an office in Albuquerque as well. However, he did not stay out of politics for too long. In 1923, the state legislature of New Mexico nominated him to become governor of Puerto Rico. He lost this bid but he used the jolt of political popularity that he received by his consideration to be appointed governor of Puerto Rico to reenter politics in New Mexico. He ran and lost an election to become a justice of the New Mexico supreme court in 1924. However, he was elected in 1927 to the New Mexico State House of Representatives. But then in 1927, the Democratic U.S. Senator from New Mexico Andrieus Jones died and Larrazolo ran and on 6 November 1928 won for Jones's remaining term. This made Larrazolo the first Mexican-American to serve in the U.S. Senate. Unfortunately, he was by that time very old and suffered with many illnesses. Because of this he only was able to make it to one session of Congress and he was only able to introduce one legislative action. This action called for the establishment of an industrial school in New Mexico for the Spanish-speaking youth to promote equal opportunity. Larrazolo died on April 7, 1930.

See also 
 List of first minority male lawyers and judges in New Mexico
 List of Hispanic and Latino Americans in the United States Congress
 List of minority governors and lieutenant governors in the United States
 List of United States senators born outside the United States

References

External links

 Octaviano A. Larrazolo Papers

|-

|-

|-

1859 births
1930 deaths
20th-century American politicians
American politicians of Mexican descent
Governors of New Mexico
Hispanic and Latino American state governors of the United States
Members of the New Mexico House of Representatives
Mexican emigrants to the United States
New Mexico Democrats
Hispanic and Latino American members of the United States Congress
New Mexico Republicans
People from Chihuahua (state)
People of the American Old West
Republican Party governors of New Mexico
Republican Party United States senators from New Mexico
Santa Fe University of Art and Design alumni
19th-century American lawyers
20th-century American lawyers
Latino conservatism in the United States